Sir Henry Bedingfeld (1506–1583) was an English privy councillor and Vice-Chamberlain of the Household, MP for Norfolk and Suffolk.

Henry Bedingfeld or Bedingfield may also refer to:

Henry Bedingfield (died 1657) (1586–1657), Member of Parliament (MP) for Norfolk 1614
Henry Bedingfield (judge) (1632–1687), MP and judge
Sir Henry Bedingfeld, 1st Baronet (1614–1685) of the Bedingfeld Baronets
Sir Henry Bedingfeld, 2nd Baronet (1636–1704) of the Bedingfeld Baronets
Sir Henry Bedingfeld, 3rd Baronet (died 1760) of the Bedingfeld Baronets

See also
Henry Paston-Bedingfeld (disambiguation)